The 2002 Florida Attorney General election took place on November 5, 2002, to elect the Attorney General of Florida. The election was won by Charlie Crist who took office in January 2003.

Republican primary

Candidates
Locke Burt, State Senator
Charlie Crist, Education Commissioner of Florida
Tom Warner, State Representative

Results

Democratic primary

Candidates
Walt Dartland
Buddy Dyer, State Senator
Scott Maddox, Mayor of Tallahassee
George H. Sheldon, former State Representative and nominee for Education Commissioner of Florida in 2000

Results

General election

Results

References

Attorney
Florida
Florida Attorney General elections